Audrée Wilhelmy (born 1985) is a Canadian writer from Quebec.

Biography 
Audrée Wilhelmy belongs to the first generation of Québécois writers whose entire academic education was devoted to creative writing. After obtaining a Bachelor's in Creative Writing from the Université du Québec à Montréal (2005-2008), she continued studying the relationship between texts and images at McGill University (2008-2010) as part of a thesis in research-creation for the Department of French Literature. Entitled Le Roman de la Rose: représentations allégoriques et transformations iconographiques du manuscrit à l'imprimé, the "research" part of her thesis was awarded the Isabel Bilingsley Prize for best thesis in French studies (2011) and she graduated on the Dean's honor list.

The "creation" part of her thesis, which she entitled La Petite, was published under the title Oss  by Éditions Leméac in 2011. It involved re-writing traditional tales, creating an amoral, ageographical and atemporal voice and delving into the female relationship to the body, to violence and to nature, all elements found in her ongoing exploration of literature. In 2012, her novel was short-listed for the Prix des libraires du Québec  [Quebec Booksellers Prize] and for Canada's Governor General's Literary Award for French fiction.

Her second novel, Les Sangs, was written for the doctorate she undertook at the Université du Québec à Montréal (2010-2015) on the study and practice of the arts. During that time, Wilhelmy continued her specialization in creative writing and her research into the text-image connection. Awarded the prestigious Vanier Canada Graduate Scholarship (2012-2015), she interviewed writers from her community to develop a typology of writers' drawings in the field of creative writing, all while working on her novel.

Les Sangs, a rewriting of Bluebeard, deals with women's freedom and agency, the fierceness of their desires and their entitlement to personal sovereignty. It was published by Quebec's Éditions Leméac in August 2013 and then again by France's Éditions Grasset in March 2015. In Quebec, the novel was short-listed for the Prix des libraires du Québec (2014)  and the France-Québec Prize (2014), while in France, it was a co-winner of the Prix Sade (2015). The text was adapted for the theatre by Camila Forteza and Anneke Brier (directed by Camila Forteza) in May 2017  and by Jean-François Guilbault in June 2018. In September of that same year, it appeared in Spanish under the title Las Sangres with the publisher Hoja de Lata in a translation by Luisa Lucuix. It was then translated into Galician by Moisés Barcia (Os Sangues, published by Rinoceronte Editora, 2020 ). The Italian translation by Silvia Turato will appear in the first quarter of 2023 with Éditions Cencellada.

In January 2014, she was the first Quebec woman to receive the "writer" grant from France's Fondation Jean-Luc Lagardère to allow her to continue her literary pursuits. After defending her thesis, entitled L'image en amont du texte littéraire [The Image Upstream of the Literary Text] (graduating with distinction on the Dean's honor list), she continued her work on research-creation beginning in January 2016 as part of a post-graduate course at the Université de Montréal. She studied, among others, the impact of digital images in the approach adopted by today's writers. In October 2016, she was welcomed by the Académie de France in Rome to a writing residency at Villa Medici (Italy).

In December 2017, she decided to devote herself full-time to her work as a novelist. Unaffiliated with any given university, she continued teaching on an occasional basis. That flexibility brought her into contact with students from all over Quebec and parts of Ontario (Ottawa, Toronto) yet did not involve the constraints that come with a permanent position within an institution. Thanks to that freedom, she has been able to participate in a number of local and international cultural events, literary festivals and book fairs.

Her third novel, Le Corps des bêtes, charts the life of a family isolated from the rest of the world. The father, a lighthouse keeper, takes his brood to the furthermost limits of a solitary shore, separated by a vast forest from the nearest village. In this initiatory novel, she tell of the entry of the Borya family's eldest daughter into puberty. The book was published by Éditions Leméac in August 2017  and by Éditions Grasset in March 2018. That same year, the novel was shortlisted for the Prix des libraires du Québec, the Prix littéraire des collégiens [College Students Literary Award]  as well as the Prix du roman d'écologie 2019 [Environmental Novel Award]. It was published in English on September 3, 2019, with the title The Body of the Beasts by House of Anansi in a translation by Susan Ouriou.

In October, November and December 2018, she was welcomed as writer-in-residency at the Banff Arts Centre. There, she worked on her fourth novel, Blanc Résine, centred around the coming together of two marginal beings — Daã, a young woman raised by 24 women in the boreal forest, and Laure, an albino man born in a coalmine. It was published in September 2019 by Éditions Leméac  and in September 2021 in Susan Ouriou's English translation, White Resin, by House of Anansi Press. Short-listed for the Grand prix du livre de Montréal (2020) and the Prix des libraires du Québec 2020, the novel was published in France by Éditions Grasset in January. That same year, it was short-listed for the Cazes prize. In May 2022, it won the award Prix Ouest-France Étonnants Voyageurs [Western France Amazing Travellers Award], one of the most prestigious international prizes for French-language literature. Susan Ouriou  was also nominated for the Governor General's Award for French to English translation at the 2022 Governor General's Awards for her English translation, White Resin.

In 2021, Wilhelmy published her fifth book, Plie la rivière, with Éditions Leméac. More a tale than a novel, it follows the encounter of a young woman and a bear. That same year, she created L'Atelier, exercice de vulnérabilité [The Workshop - an exercise in vulnerability], a digital project for which she received the Prix Ambassadeur Web Télé-Québec 2021 at the Grands Prix de la culture Desjardins. The web platform includes texts by a number of female writers reflecting on their writing process as well as a detailed journal on her own creative process.

In the fall of 2021, she founded Presses du Bûcher, a publishing house devoted to the artisanal production of artists' books.

In 2022, Éditions Alto published the literary oracle Clairvoyantes, which she conceived, designed and piloted. The divinatory game, "an invitation to use the symbolic power of stories to observe challenges, dreams, relationships and everyday objects from a new angle," brought together fifteen women writers as well as the photographer Justine Latour, whose dreamlike works accompany the texts. In all, over forty women took part in the project which she oversaw. It allowed her to continue to showcase the voices of women artists from all disciplines. For this project, she is finalist for the Artiste de l'année prize.

Books 
 2011 : Oss, Montreal, Leméac, 76p.
 2013 : Les Sangs, Montreal, Leméac, 156 p.; Paris, Grasset (2015), 192p.
 2017 : Le Corps des bêtes, Montreal, Leméac, 158 p.; Paris, Grasset (2018), 200p.
 2019 : Blanc Résine, Montreal, Leméac, 347 p; Paris, Grasset (2022), 368 p.
 2021 : Plie la rivière, Montreal, Leméac, 80 p.
 2022 : Clairvoyantes, Quebec, Alto.

Short stories 
 2011 : "La Pièce montée", dans Le monstre n'est pas celui qu'on croit, France : Éditions Rhubarbes.
 2012 : "La Femme du Général", Zinc, n°27, septembre 2012.
 2013 : "La Méduse".
 2014 : "La Balançoire", À l'essai, n°1, juin 2014.
 2014 : "Peau de Sucre", Jet d'encre, n°23.
 2015 : "Envie: lettre à une autre génération", Les Libraires, n°87, janvier 2015.
 2015 : "Petite Fleur", Revue XYZ, n°121, printemps 2015.
 2015 : "Les Jours charnels", La Presse+, dossier Fan fictions, 2 août 2015.
 2016 : "Sujet: tapis", Opuscule, 1er mai 2016.
 2017 : "Ada en première", Nouveau Projet, n°10, automne 2017.
 2017 : "La bête au corps", Lettres québécoises, n°167, automne 2017.
 2017 : "La Colombe", dans Pulpe, recueil de nouvelles érotiques dirigé par Stéphane Dompierre, Montréal, Québec Amérique, novembre 2017.
2019 : "Daã", dans Voix d'écrivaines francophones, Anthologie du Parlement des écrivaines francophones coordonnée par Fawzia Zouari, Orléans, Regain de lecture, septembre 2019.
2019: "Pointe-Lévy", Estuaire, n°177, automne 2019.

Prize and nominations 
2022 : Prix Ouest-France Étonnants Voyageurs, Blanc Résine (France)
2022 : Finaliste, Prix du CALC artiste de l'année, Grands Prix de la culture, Lanaudière (Québec)
2022 : Finaliste, Prix Habiter le Monde, Blanc Résine (France)
2022 : Finaliste, Prix Cazes, Blanc Résine (France)
2021 : Prix Ambassadeur Web Télé-Québec, L'Atelier: Exercice de vulnérabilité (Québec)
2020 : Sélection du jury, Grand prix du livre de Montréal, Blanc Résine (Québec)
2020 : Finaliste, Prix des libraires du Québec, Blanc Résine (Québec)
2019 : Finaliste, Prix du roman d'écologie 2019, Le Corps des bêtes (France)
2019 : Finaliste, Prix France-Canada 2019, Le Corps des bêtes (France)
2018 : Finaliste, Prix littéraire des collégiens 2018, Le Corps des bêtes (Québec)
 2018 : Liste préliminaire, Prix des libraires du Québec, Le Corps des bêtes (Québec)
2018 : Liste préliminaire, Prix SDGL Révélation de la Société des gens de lettres, Le Corps des bêtes (France)
2015 : Prix Sade, Les Sangs (France)
 2015 : Finaliste, Prix Marie Claire du roman féminin, Les Sangs (France)
 2015 : Finaliste, prix des lecteurs de l'Hebdo, Les Sangs (France)
2014 : Récipiendaire, Bourse «écrivain» de la Fondation Jean-Luc Lagardère (France)
 2014 : Finaliste, Prix littéraire France-Québec, Les Sangs (Québec)
 2014 : Finaliste, Prix des libraires du Québec, Les Sangs (Québec)
2012 : Finaliste, Prix du Gouverneur général du Canada, Oss (Canada)
2012 : Liste préliminaire, Prix des libraires du Québec, Oss (Québec)

References

1985 births
Living people
21st-century Canadian novelists
21st-century Canadian women writers
21st-century Canadian short story writers
Canadian novelists in French
Canadian short story writers in French
Canadian women novelists
Canadian women short story writers
French Quebecers
McGill University alumni
Université du Québec à Montréal alumni
Writers from Quebec City